Dysdaemonia boreas is a moth of the  family Saturniidae. It is found from Mexico to Guyanas.

External links
 Moths of Belize
 Images

Arsenurinae
Moths described in 1775
Taxa named by Pieter Cramer